Coastal Credit Union Music Park (originally named Walnut Creek Amphitheatre and formerly Alltel Pavilion) is an outdoor amphitheater located in Raleigh, North Carolina, United States, that specializes in hosting large concerts.

The amphitheater is part of a  complex, located on the west bank of Walnut Creek, southeast of Raleigh, near the I-40/US 64/I-440 (Beltline) interchange.

It was built by the City of Raleigh, with private sector participation, at a cost of $13.5 million and opened on July 4, 1991, with the Connells as the inaugural act.

Seating capacity is about 6,847, of which about half are under cover; the open lawn can accommodate another 13,653.

The venue is operated by Live Nation Entertainment, a concert promoting company, under lease from the City of Raleigh.

Events

See also
List of contemporary amphitheaters
Live Nation

References

External links
 
 Walnut Creek Amphitheatre

1991 establishments in North Carolina
Buildings and structures in Raleigh, North Carolina
Amphitheaters in North Carolina
Amphitheaters in the United States
Landmarks in North Carolina
Music venues in North Carolina
Tourist attractions in Raleigh, North Carolina